Route 395 or Highway 395 may refer to:

Canada
 British Columbia Highway 395
 Manitoba Provincial Road 395
 New Brunswick Route 395
 Nova Scotia Route 395
  Quebec Route 395

Great Britain
  A395 road

Japan
  Japan National Route 395

United States
  Interstate 395
  U.S. Route 395
  Arkansas Highway 395
 California State Route 395 (former)
  Florida State Road 395 (former)
  Kentucky Route 395
 Massachusetts Route 395 (former)
 Nevada State Route 395 (former)
  New Mexico State Road 395
  New York State Route 395
 Oregon Route 395 (former)
 Washington State Route 395 (former)